Toczeń may refer to the following places in Poland:

Toczeń, Greater Poland Voivodeship (west-central Poland)
Toczeń, Pomeranian Voivodeship (north Poland)